Agha Sajjad Gul is a producer, director and one of the biggest media moguls in Pakistan. He is the youngest of the sons of renowned film studio owner and a pioneer of Pakistan film industry, the late Agha G. A. Gul (1913–1983). Aijaz, Riaz and Shahzad are the other sons of the late Agha G. A. Gul, the original owner and creator of Evernew Studios, on Multan Road, Lahore, Pakistan after the Independence of Pakistan in 1947. The Late Agha G. A. Gul still remains one of the pioneers of Pakistan film industry along with the film producers and studio owners, Shaukat Hussain Rizvi and Anwar Kamal Pasha. Sajjad Gul owns the film production house Evernew Studios in Lahore and he is the CEO of one of the media houses in Pakistan, Evernew Group. He is currently managing 8 companies: Evernew Concept (advertising agency), Evernew Entertainment (production company), Evernew Pictures, Evernew Studios, Evernew Carat, Evernew Solutions, Evernew Films and Evernew Music, which will launch soon. Apart from overseeing and managing the studio, Sajjad Gul has closely been linked to the development and growth of Pakistani cinema.

Filmography

Producer
Doorian (1984)
International Gorillay (1990)
Jo Darr Gya Woh Marr Gya (1995)
Deewane Tere Pyar Ke (1998)
No Paisa No Problem (2000)
Tere Pyar Mein (2000)
Chalo Ishq Larain (2002)

Director
Chalo Ishq Larain (2002)

Television drama serials

Producer
 Mehndi
 Chaandni Raatain
 Main Aur Tum
 Nestlé Nesvita Women of Strength '09
 Tum Kahan Hum Kahan
 Jiaa Naa Jaye
 Aik Raat Chand Si
 Aik Aur Kahani
 Na Tum Jano Na Hum Janein
 Thora Thora Pyar 
 Woh Rishtey Woh Naatey
 Tumharay Liay
 Uraan
 Azar Ki Ayegi Baraat
 Dolly ki Ayegi Baraat
 Takkay ki Ayegi Baraat
 Annie Ki Ayegi Baraat
 Carte d'Or  'Meethi Si Lagan' Series

References

External links
, Retrieved 3 Feb 2016
, Retrieved 3 Feb 2016
, Retrieved 3 Feb 2016
, Retrieved 3 Feb 2016
, Retrieved 3 Feb 2016

Year of birth missing (living people)
Living people
Pakistani film producers
Pakistani film directors